The Columbus Solons were a professional baseball team in the American Association from 1889 to 1891.  In three seasons, they won 200 games and lost 209 for a winning percentage of .489.  Their home games were played at Recreation Park in Columbus, Ohio.

The Solons were managed by Al Buckenberger (99–119), Gus Schmelz (99–89), and Pat Sullivan (2–1).  Some of their top players were pitchers Mark Baldwin, Ice Box Chamberlain, and Hank Gastright, catcher Jack O'Connor, first baseman Dave Orr, third baseman Lefty Marr, and outfielders Charlie Duffee and Spud Johnson.

See also
1889 Columbus Solons season
1890 Columbus Solons season
1891 Columbus Solons season
Columbus Solons all-time roster

External links
Baseball Reference team index

 
American Association (1882–1891) baseball teams
Baseball teams in Columbus, Ohio
Defunct baseball teams in Ohio
Baseball teams disestablished in 1891
Baseball teams established in 1889